The Victorian Gothic and Art Deco Ensembles of Bombay is a collection of 19th-century Victorian Revival public and 20th-century Mumbai Art Deco private buildings in the Fort precinct of Mumbai, Maharashtra, India. This ensemble was declared a UNESCO World Heritage Site in 2018.

This buildings are set around the Oval Maidan, a large recreational ground that was once known as the Esplanade. The east of the Oval is flanked by the Victorian Gothic public buildings and the western side is flanked by the Art Deco buildings of Back bay Reclamation and Marine Drive. This nomination aims to safeguard a total of 94 buildings.

The 19th century Victorian Gothic buildings that lie to the east of the Oval are mainly the Mumbai High Court, The University of Mumbai (Fort Campus) and The City Civil and Sessions Court (Housed in the Old Secretariat Building). This stretch also houses one of the landmarks of Mumbai, the Rajabai Clock Tower. The 20th century Art Deco buildings flank the western stretch of the Oval and consist mainly of privately owned residential buildings and the Eros Cinema among others.

This ensemble of Victorian Gothic and Art Deco buildings was added to the list of World Heritage Sites on 30 June 2018 during 42nd session of World Heritage Committee at Manama, Bahrain.

List of heritage structures or sites

Victorian

Indian Neo-Gothic (Hindu Gothic) architecture
City Civil and Sessions Court (Old Secretariat)
University of Bombay complex:
Rajabai Clock Tower
University Library
Convocation Hall
Mumbai High Court
Public Works Department Building
Esplanade Mansion
David Sassoon Library
Elphinstone College
Maharashtra Police Headquarters 
Indian Mercantile Mansion
Wellington Fountain

Neoclassical
Standard Chartered Bank Building 
Army and Navy Building
Institute of Science
Sir Cowasji Jehangir Hall, National Gallery of Modern Art

Indo-Saracenic
Western Railway Headquarters Offices
Chhatrapati Shivaji Maharaj Vastu Sangrahalaya
Majestic Aamdar Niwas

Art Deco
Regal Cinema
Motabhoy Mansion
Soona Mahal
Keval Mahal
Buildings around the Oval Maidan and Marine Drive

Gallery

References

External links
 Art Deco Buildings in Bombay (Flickr album)

 
World Heritage Sites in India